Buffalo Bulls baseball represents the University at Buffalo in college baseball at the NCAA Division I level.

2010

The 2010 Buffalo Bulls baseball team represented the University at Buffalo in the 2010 NCAA Division I baseball season. The Bulls played their home games at Amherst Audubon Field, and were led by fourth year head coach Ron Torgalski. They finished the season 24–29, 9–18 in MAC play to finish in fifth place in the East Division.

2011

The 2011 Buffalo Bulls baseball team represented the University at Buffalo in the 2011 NCAA Division I baseball season. The Bulls played their home games at Amherst Audubon Field, and were led by fifth year head coach Ron Torgalski. They finished the season 14–38, 3–22 in MAC play to finish in sixth place in the East Division.

2012

The 2012 Buffalo Bulls baseball team represented the University at Buffalo in the 2012 NCAA Division I baseball season. The Bulls played their home games at Amherst Audubon Field, and were led by sixth year head coach Ron Torgalski. They finished the season 20–36, 10–16 in MAC play to finish in fourth place in the East Division.

Draft Selections
 C Tom Murphy – 3rd Round, 105th Overall Colorado Rockies

2013

The 2013 Buffalo Bulls baseball team represented the University at Buffalo in the 2013 NCAA Division I baseball season. The Bulls played their home games at Amherst Audubon Field, and were led by seventh year head coach Ron Torgalski. They finished the season 33–24, 19–7 in MAC play to finish in second place in the East Division.

Draft Selections
 CF Jason Kanzler – 20th Round, 590th Overall Minnesota Twins

2014

The 2014 Buffalo Bulls baseball team represented the University at Buffalo in the 2014 NCAA Division I baseball season. The Bulls played their home games at Amherst Audubon Field, and were led by eighth year head coach Ron Torgalski. They finished the season 24–24, 13–13 in MAC play to finish in fourth place in the East Division.

Draft Selections
 3B Tyler Mautner – 14th Round, 410th Overall Minnesota Twins
 RHP Mike Burke – 30th Round, 901st Overall Baltimore Orioles

2015

The 2015 Buffalo Bulls baseball team represented the University at Buffalo in the 2015 NCAA Division I baseball season. The Bulls played their home games at Amherst Audubon Field, and were led by ninth year head coach Ron Torgalski. They finished the season 16–35, 7–20 in MAC play to finish in sixth place in the East Division.

Draft Selections
 OF Nick Sinay – 22nd Round, 662th Overall Toronto Blue Jays

2016

The 2016 Buffalo Bulls baseball team will represent the University at Buffalo in the 2016 NCAA Division I baseball season. The Bulls will play their home games at Amherst Audubon Field, and will be led by tenth year head coach Ron Torgalski.

2017

The 2017 Buffalo Bulls baseball team represented the University at Buffalo in the 2017 NCAA Division I baseball season, the final season in the program's history. The Bulls played their home games at Amherst Audubon Field, and were led by 11th year head coach Ron Torgalski. The Bulls finished 17–34 overall and 8–16 in Mid-American Conference (MAC) play, which put them in a tie for fourth place in the MAC East division and a tie for 10th in the overall conference standings. Buffalo did not qualify for the 2017 Mid-American Conference baseball tournament as the tournament only the top eight teams in the conference.

Buffalo announced the elimination of baseball and three other sports on April 3, 2017. Their final home game was a 10-inning, 10–9 win over Niagara on May 16, and the final game in the program's history was played May 20 at Western Michigan, a 7–3 loss to the Broncos as part of a doubleheader.

References

Buffalo Bulls baseball seasons